I Am (stylized in sentence case) is the debut extended play by South Korean girl group (G)I-dle. The album was released digitally on May 2, 2018, and physically on May 3, 2018, by Cube Entertainment. The album contains six tracks including the lead single, "Latata", which was composed by Big Sancho and member Soyeon, and is a blend of several different genres.

Background and release
On April 18, 2018, Cube Entertainment announced via SNS that the group would debut with the mini-album I Am and title-track "Latata".

Concept images featuring each of the members were released from April 23–24, 2018.

Soyeon described the album I Am as "an album containing six different personalities." She continued, “I wrote the lyrics for the title song "Latata" while thinking about each member."

Promotion

The group started promoting their title track "Latata" on May 3. They first performed the lead single on Mnet's M Countdown, followed by performances on KBS' Music Bank, MBC's Show! Music Core and SBS's Inkigayo. They received their first-ever music show win since debut on May 22, 2018 on SBS MTV's The Show. Two days later, on May 24, the group received their second music show win for "Latata" on M Countdown.

Commercial performance
I Am debuted and peaked at number thirteen on the Gaon Album Chart issued on April 29, 2018. The album also debuted at number seven and has since peaked at number five on Billboard's World Albums issued on May 9, 2018. The EP has sold 1,000 copies in America as of August 2018.

The album placed at number 13 on Gaon for the month of May 2018, with 15,288 copies sold. The album has sold over 21,916 physical copies as of July 2018.

I Am ranks No. 11 on Billboard's Best K-pop Album of 2018.

In April, 2020, I Am achieved 34,000 album-equivalent units, making it (G)I-dle's biggest-selling album in the United States.

Track listing

Charts

Weekly charts

Monthly charts

Certifications and sales

Release history

References

External links

2018 debut EPs
Cube Entertainment EPs
(G)I-dle EPs
Korean-language EPs
Albums produced by Jeon So-yeon